Ángel Lo Valvo (August 11, 1909 in Arrecifes, Buenos Aires Province – January 8, 1978) was an Argentine race-car driver who won the first-ever Turismo Carretera competition in 1937. Lo Valvo also won the first Turismo Carretera Championship in 1939.

He entered some races using pseudonym Hipómenes, a Spanish-language term for Greek mythology personage, Hippomenes.

External links
 Profile at HistoricRacing.com

1909 births
1978 deaths
People from Arrecifes
Argentine racing drivers
Turismo Carretera drivers
Sportspeople from Buenos Aires Province